Damien Florian Gérald Tixier (born June 23, 1980) is a French football defender who last played for FC Nantes in Ligue 2. He formerly played for Swiss Super League club Neuchâtel Xamax until his contract was terminated on March 28, 2010 due to an excessive number of red cards. He joined FC Nantes in Ligue 2 on 10 July 2010.

References

External links

1980 births
Living people
French footballers
French expatriate sportspeople in Switzerland
Expatriate footballers in Switzerland
U.D. Leiria players
RC Lens players
Footballers from Nîmes
Le Havre AC players
Associação Académica de Coimbra – O.A.F. players
Associação Naval 1º de Maio players
Neuchâtel Xamax FCS players
FC Nantes players
Ligue 1 players
Ligue 2 players
Primeira Liga players
Swiss Super League players
Association football defenders